Luthersville is a city in Meriwether County, Georgia, United States. The population was 776 at the 2020 census, down from 874 in 2010.

History
The Georgia General Assembly incorporated Luthersville as a town in 1872. The community was named after the 16th-century German reformer Martin Luther.

Geography
Luthersville is located in northern Meriwether County at  (33.209299, −84.745286). Its northern border is the Coweta County line. U.S. Route 27 Alternate is Luthersville's Main Street; the highway leads south  to Greenville, the Meriwether county seat, and north  to Newnan. Georgia State Route 54 crosses US 27 Alternate in the center of Luthersville; it leads northeast  to Turin and southwest the same distance to Hogansville.

The city sits on a ridge that forms the divide between the Chattahoochee River watershed to the west and the Flint River watershed to the east. The northwest part of the city drains to Yellowjacket Creek, a tributary of the Chattahoochee, while the southern part of the city drains to Coleman Creek and the northeast part drains to Bear Creek, both tributaries of the Flint.

Demographics

2020 census

As of the 2020 United States census, there were 776 people, 248 households, and 173 families residing in the city.

2000 census
As of the census of 2000, there were 783 people, 273 households, and 205 families residing in the city. The racial makeup of the city was 43.93% White, 51.85% African American, 0.89% Native American, 2.43% from other races, and 0.89% from two or more races. Hispanic or Latino of any race were 3.96% of the population.

There were 273 households, out of which 42.1% had children under the age of 18 living with them, 46.2% were married couples living together, 21.2% had a female householder with no husband present, and 24.9% were non-families. 20.5% of all households were made up of individuals, and 8.1% had someone living alone who was 65 years of age or older. The average household size was 2.87 and the average family size was 3.31.

In the city, the population was spread out, with 32.7% under the age of 18, 10.1% from 18 to 24, 30.7% from 25 to 44, 17.9% from 45 to 64, and 8.7% who were 65 years of age or older. The median age was 31 years. For every 100 females, there were 87.3 males. For every 100 females age 18 and over, there were 84.9 males.

The median income for a household in the city was $28,906, and the median income for a family was $29,444. Males had a median income of $26,250 versus $21,667 for females. The per capita income for the city was $11,033. About 20.0% of families and 23.9% of the population were below the poverty line, including 30.8% of those under age 18 and 8.7% of those age 65 or over.

References

Cities in Georgia (U.S. state)
Cities in Meriwether County, Georgia